Japan competed at the 1972 Summer Olympics in Munich, West Germany. 184 competitors, 148 men and 36 women, took part in 113 events in 21 sports.

Medalists

| width=78% align=left valign=top |

| width=22% align=left valign=top |

Archery

In the first modern archery competition at the Olympics, Japan entered three men and one woman. Their highest placing competitor was Yoshiko Akayama, at 17th place in the women's competition.

Men's Individual Competition:
 Hiroshi Kajikawa — 2381 points (→ 19th place)
 Masashi Hibino — 2344 points (→ 29th place)
 Shinji Nakamoto — 2287 points (→ 38th place)

Women's Individual Competition:
 Yoshiko Akayama — 2301 points (→ 17th place)

Athletics

Men's 5000 metres
Keisuke Sawaki
 Heat — 13:44.8 (→ did not advance)

Takaharu Koyama
 Heat — 14:12.6 (→ did not advance)

Men's High Jump
Hidehiko Tomizawa
 Qualifying Round — 2.15m
 Final — 2.05m (→ 19th place)

Kuniyoshi Sugioka
 Qualification Round — 2.06m (→ did not advance)

Basketball

Boxing

Men's Light Flyweight (– 48 kg)
 Yoshimitsu Aragaki
 First Round — Lost to Asen Nikolov (BUL), 0:5

Canoeing

Cycling

Three cyclists represented Japan in 1972.

Sprint
 Yoshikazu Cho
 Yaichi Numata

1000m time trial
 Takafumi Matsuda
 Final — 1:10.00 (→ 20th place)

Tandem
 Yaichi Numata and Yoshikazu Cho → 12th place

Diving

Men's 3m Springboard
 Junji Yuasa — 316.95 points (→ 24th place)

Men's 10m Platform
 Junji Yuasa — 276.00 points (→ 19th place)

Women's 3m Springboard
 Taeko Kubo — 236.25 points (→ 24th place)

Women's 10m Platform
 Keiko Otsubo — 168.24 points (→ 23rd place)

Equestrian

Fencing

Five fencers, all men, represented Japan in 1972.

Men's foil
 Hiroshi Nakajima
 Ichiro Serizawa
 Kiyoshi Uehara

Men's team foil
 Shiro Maruyama, Masaya Fukuda, Hiroshi Nakajima, Kiyoshi Uehara, Ichiro Serizawa

Gymnastics

Handball

Men's Team Competition
Preliminary Round
 Lost to Yugoslavia (14-20)
 Lost to Hungary (12-20)
 Defeated United States (20-16)
Classification Matches
 9th/12th place: Lost to Norway (17-19)
 11th/12th place: Defeated Iceland (19-18) → 11th place

Judo

Modern pentathlon

Three male pentathletes represented Japan in 1972.

Men's Individual Competition:
 Masaru Sakano — 4627 points (→ 31st place)
 Yuso Makihira — 4583 points (→ 33rd place)
 Akira Kubo — 4371 points (→ 49th place)

Men's Team Competition:
 Sakano, Makihara, and Kubo — 13569 points (13th place)

Rowing

Men's Single Sculls
Hideo Okamoto
Heat — 8:20.82
Repechage — 8:27.36 (→ did not advance)

Sailing

Men's Finn:
 Kazuoki Matsuyama — 176.0 (→ 27th place)

Men's Flying Dutchman:
Akira Yamamura and Takashi Yamamura — 128.0 (→ 19th place)

Shooting

Six male shooters represented Japan in 1972.
Open

Swimming

Volleyball

Men's Team Competition
Preliminary Round (Group B)
 Defeated Romania (3-1)
 Defeated Cuba (3-0)
 Defeated East Germany (3-0)
 Defeated Brazil (3-0)
 Defeated West Germany (3-0)
Semifinals
 Defeated Bulgaria (3-2)
Final
 Defeated East Germany (3-1) →  Gold Medal

Team Roster
Kenji Kimura
Yoshinide Fukao
Junko Morita
Seiji Ohko
Tadayoshi Yokota
Katsutoshi Nekoda
Yasuhiro Noguchi
Kenji Shimaoka
Yūzo Nakamura
Tetsuo Nishimoto
Massao Minami
Tetsuo Satō

Water polo

Men's Team Competition
Preliminary Round (Group C)
 Lost to Spain (4-6)
 Lost to Soviet Union (1-11)
 Lost to Bulgaria (4-7)
 Lost to Italy (5-12) → Did not advance

 Team Roster
 Yukiharu Oshita
 Hirokatsu Kuwayama
 Toshio Takahashi
 Shuzo Yajima
 Hiroshi Hashimoto
 Koji Nakano
 Naoto Minegishi
 Tatsuo Jihira
 Takashi Kimura
 Yoshihiro Yasumi
 Toru Arase

Weightlifting

Wrestling

Badminton (demonstration sports)
Men's Doubles:
 Ippei Kojima and Suresh Goel of India
 1st round - Lost to Ng. Boon Bee and Punch Gunalan of Malaysia (8 - 15, 1 - 15)

Women's Singles:
 Noriko Nakayama →  Gold Medal
 1st round - defeated Ulla Strand of Denmark (11 - 5, 11 - 9)
 Semi–Final - defeated Gillian Gilks of Great Britain (11 - 3, 8 - 11, 11 - 9)
 Final - defeated Utami Dewi of Indonesia (11 - 5, 11 - 3)
 Hiroe Yuki →  bronze medal
 1st round - defeated Joke van Beusekom of Netherlands (11 - 3, 11 - 2)
 Semi-Final - lost to Utami Dewi of Indonesia (5 - 11, 9 - 11)

Mixed Doubles:
 Kojima and Nakayama
 1st round - lost to Talbot and Gilks of Great Britain (9 - 15, 4 - 15)

References

Nations at the 1972 Summer Olympics
1972 Summer Olympics
Summer Olympics